Michael Lorant is an American singer-musician, best known for producing the album Jesus Christ Superstar: A Resurrection, a project done with Amy Ray and Emily Saliers, members of Indigo Girls. He is also well known for performing a live stage version with many musicians from the Atlanta alternative scene.  Lorant played guitar, drums, piano, and other instruments for the album. He sang the role of Judas Iscariot, and also sang the roles of other characters on the album.

Discography
Jesus Christ Superstar: A Resurrection

References 

American singer-songwriters
Living people
Year of birth missing (living people)